Amirhossein Aslanian (born September 16, 1978) is a retired Iranian footballer. He is mostly known for his time in Persepolis as a "super-sub". He gained the Top Goalscorer honour at Iranian football 2nd league in 2000. He was invited to the Iranian National Football Team under Jalal Talebi's coaching.

Early life 
Aslanian was born on December 16, 1979, but his birth certificate is dated 1978. His father was a doctor. Aslanian learned karate prior becoming a footballer. He served his conscription at Nirouye Zamini.

Club career 
He joined Iranian club Persepolis on a 5-year contract in 2000, under management of Ali Parvin. He played for them until he was fired by then-Coach Vinko Begović in October 2003. In January 2004, he was involved in a fatal car accident and became injured, keeping him off the field for 2 years. He signed with Paykan, but during the match against Bargh Shiraz in 2006 he experienced a heart attack. The next season, he joined Damash Tehran but left them quickly after the club was moved to Gilan Province. He usually played as a substitute player at Damash.

Club Career Statistics

Honours

Club
Persepolis
Persian Gulf Pro League (1) : 2001–02

References

1979 births
Living people
Iranian footballers
Persepolis F.C. players
Paykan F.C. players
Sportspeople from Tehran
Association football forwards